The 1992–93 Bulgarian Hockey League season was the 41st season of the Bulgarian Hockey League, the top level of ice hockey in Bulgaria. Five teams participated in the league, and HK Slavia Sofia won the championship.

Regular season

Final
 HK Levski Sofia - HK Slavia Sofia 2:3/1:4

External links
 Season on hockeyarchives.info

Bulgarian Hockey League seasons
Bul
Bulg